The 71st British Academy Film Awards, more commonly known as the BAFTAs, were held on 18 February 2018 at the Royal Albert Hall in London, honouring the best national and foreign films of 2017. Presented by the British Academy of Film and Television Arts, accolades were handed out for the best feature-length film and documentaries of any nationality that were screened at British cinemas in 2017. Following revelations of sexual harassment in the film industry, many attendees wore black or a badge to show their support for the Time's Up movement.

The nominees were announced on 9 January 2018 by actresses Natalie Dormer and Letitia Wright. The Shape of Water received the most nominations in twelve categories; Darkest Hour and Three Billboards Outside Ebbing, Missouri followed with nine each. As with the 75th Golden Globe Awards, there was criticism for the lack of female nominees for Best Director, with Greta Gerwig notably not nominated for Lady Bird.

English actress Joanna Lumley hosted the ceremony for the first time, replacing Stephen Fry following his twelve years of service as host.

Winners and nominees

The nominees were announced on 9 January 2018. The winners were announced on 18 February 2018.

BAFTA Fellowship

 Ridley Scott

Outstanding British Contribution to Cinema

 National Film and Television School

Statistics

Presenters
The following individuals presented awards at the ceremony:
Jennifer Lawrence presented Outstanding British Film
Margot Robbie and Octavia Spencer presented EE Rising Star Award
Sergei Polunin and Gemma Chan presented Best Original Music and Best Hair and Makeup
Edward Holcroft and Tom Taylor presented Best Costume Design and Best Animated Film
Hayley Squires and Natalie Dormer presented Best Editing
Celia Imrie presented the Outstanding British Contribution to Cinema
Anya Taylor-Joy and Letitia Wright presented Best Short Animation and Best Short Film
Andrea Riseborough presented Best Film Not in the English Language
Gugu Mbatha-Raw and Orlando Bloom presented Best Adapted Screenplay
Lupita Nyong'o presented Best Actor in a Supporting Role
Rebecca Ferguson and Toby Jones presented Best Production Design
Karen Gillan and Taron Egerton presented Best Special Visual Effects
Lily James and Gemma Arterton presented Outstanding Debut by a British Writer, Director or Producer
Bryan Cranston presented Best Actress in a Supporting Role
Sam Claflin and Will Poulter presented Best Sound
Rachel Weisz and Nicholas Hoult presented Best Original Screenplay
Dennis Quaid presented Best Cinematography
Salma Hayek presented Best Actor in a Leading Role
Chiwetel Ejiofor presented Best Actress in a Leading Role
Naomie Harris and Patrick Stewart presented Best Director
Daniel Craig presented Best Film
Prince William and Kenneth Branagh presented the BAFTA Fellowship

In Memoriam

Jerry Lewis
John G. Avildsen
Allison Shearmur
Walter Lassally
Martin Landau
Johann Johannsson
John Mollo
Shashi Kapoor
Jeanne Moreau
Alan MacDonald
John Heyman
Ray Merrin
Michael Ballhaus
Bill Butler
George A. Romero
Jonathan Demme
Terence Marsh
Bill Paxton
Pamela Engel
Sam Shepard
Harry Dean Stanton
Jill Messick
Tobe Hooper
Steve Christian
Omid Nooshin
Roger Moore

See also
 7th AACTA International Awards
 90th Academy Awards
 43rd César Awards
 23rd Critics' Choice Awards
 70th Directors Guild of America Awards
 31st European Film Awards
 75th Golden Globe Awards
 38th Golden Raspberry Awards
 32nd Goya Awards
 33rd Independent Spirit Awards
 23rd Lumières Awards
 8th Magritte Awards
 5th Platino Awards
 29th Producers Guild of America Awards
 22nd Satellite Awards
 44th Saturn Awards
 24th Screen Actors Guild Awards
 70th Writers Guild of America Awards

References

External links
 

2017 film awards
2018 in British cinema
2018 in London
Film071
February 2018 events in the United Kingdom
Events at the Royal Albert Hall
2017 awards in the United Kingdom